Athletic Park was a sports ground used mostly for rugby matches in Wellington, New Zealand. It closed in 1999.

History

The ground was also the inaugural home of New Zealand's principal knockout football tournament, the Chatham Cup (first held in 1923).

It has now been demolished and replaced with a retirement village. It was famous for a very steep grandstand (the Millard Stand) which used to sway a little in the regular strong winds that Wellington is famous for. The stand was unsafe as Wellington is very susceptible to earthquakes.

Athletic Park was an open park overlooking Cook Strait and the Pacific Ocean and was exposed to strong winds – most famously the 1961 All Black Test against France which was played in hurricane-force winds.

Throughout the 1980s several proposals were made to modernise the grounds, but instead a decision was made to build a new stadium.  Several alternatives were proposed, including a new stadium in Porirua, revamping the Basin Reserve or Fraser Park in Hutt Valley, and the ultimately successful proposal to build a stadium on unused railway land near the Wellington railway station. In 1999, Athletic Park was closed and replaced by Wellington Regional Stadium, referred to colloquially as "The Cake Tin", which sits directly behind the Wellington railway station – this being popular with supporters coming from Porirua, and the Hutt Valley.

Sports
The Athletic Park hosted 42 Test matches involving the All Blacks from 1904 to 1999, including the 43–6 win over Australia in 1996.

The last Test match was against France on 26 June 1999 with the All Blacks winning 54–7, while the last rugby match played at Athletic Park was on 10 October 1999, between Wellington and Otago NPC teams, with Wellington winning 36–16.

Rugby World Cup
Athletic Park hosted four matches of the 1987 Rugby World Cup.

Music and other events
Athletic Park also played host to other non-sports events, including a visit by Pope John Paul II in 1986 and various rock concerts.

Kiss performed a concert in 1980 as part of their Unmasked Tour. In 1983, David Bowie and Dire Straits performed at Athletic Park, with further performances by Dire Straits in 1986 and 1991. Elton John performed two concerts there, the first on 10 March 1982 as part of his Jump Up! Tour and the second was on 22 February 1984 as part of his Too Low for Zero Tour. Eurythmics performed on 28 January 1987 as part of their Revenge Tour.

Fleetwood Mac played what is regarded as 'the worst concert ever' at Athletic Park in March 1980 as the band had an internal meltdown and left the stage during the show to 'sort things out' before returning to continue. Those attending chanted for the return of the supporting band, New Zealand's Street Talk as the music deteriorated.

References

External links
 Athletic Park remembered

Rugby union stadiums in New Zealand
Sports venues in Wellington City
Rugby World Cup stadiums
Defunct sports venues in New Zealand
Defunct rugby union venues
1890s architecture in New Zealand
1999 disestablishments in New Zealand